The Confederation of UK Coal Producers (or CoalPro) is the UK trade association for coal mining companies. Full members include Banks Developments, Celtic Energy, Kier Mining, Miller Argent, Hall Construction, Hargreaves Services, and Land Engineering Services.

Function
It represents 90% of the UK coal producing industry, now that it is made up of disparate smaller companies, having once been run by the National Coal Board until 1987.

History
The UK coal industry employs less than 1,000 people directly. Around 2% of the UK's electricity is generated by coal power. The organization was formed in 1991. As of November 2022 the website has not been operating for a while. Since most of coal mining in the UK has stopped, the organization is most likely defunct itself due to the original founders having exited the industry.

See also
 British Coal Utilisation Research Association
 Coal Authority
 Institute of Materials, Minerals and Mining
 National Coal Mining Museum for England
 Mining Association of the United Kingdom

External links
 CoalPro
 Coal industry in Scotland in March 2005

Coal companies of the United Kingdom
Coal organizations
Organisations based in Wakefield
Organizations established in 1991
Mining organizations
Trade associations based in the United Kingdom
1991 establishments in the United Kingdom